The 1993 South Asian Games, officially the 6th South Asian Games, took place from December 20 to December 27, 1993, in Dhaka, Bangladesh and thus in SAF games history, Dhaka became the first city to host the event for second time.

Participating nations

A total of 7 countries participated in the 1993 South Asian Games.

Sports 

There were 11 official sports for the 6th SAF Games. They were:
  Athletics 
  Boxing 
  Football
  Judo (debut) 
  Kabaddi
  Shooting 
  Swimming
  Table Tennis 
  Tennis
  Volleyball 
  Weightlifting

Medal tally

References 

South Asian Games
1993 South Asian Games
S
S
South Asian Games, 1993
1993 in Asian sport
Multi-sport events in Bangladesh
Sport in Dhaka
December 1993 sports events in Asia